Austroaeschna subapicalis is a species of large dragonfly in the family Telephlebiidae, known commonly as the conehead darner. It inhabits mountain streams in New South Wales and Victoria, Australia.

Austroaeschna subapicalis is a very dark dragonfly with indistinct pale markings. 
It appears similar to the mountain darner, Austroaeschna atrata, which is found in alpine areas of southern New South Wales and Victoria.

Gallery

See also
List of dragonflies of Australia

References

Telephlebiidae
Odonata of Australia
Endemic fauna of Australia
Taxa named by Günther Theischinger
Insects described in 1982